Myosorex is a mammal genus in the Soricidae (shrew) family. The genus, collectively referred to as the mouse shrews, contains these species:

Babault's mouse shrew, M. babaulti
Montane mouse shrew, M.  blarina
Bururi forest shrew, M. bururiensis 
Dark-footed mouse shrew, M. cafer
Eisentraut's mouse shrew, M. eisentrauti
Geata mouse shrew, M. geata
Nyika mouse shrew or Nyika burrowing shrew, M. gnoskei
Kahuzi swamp shrew, M. jejei 
Kabogo mouse shrew M. kabogoensis 
Kihaule's mouse shrew, M. kihaulei
Long-tailed forest shrew, M. longicaudatus
Meester's forest shrew, M. meesteri 
Oku mouse shrew, M. okuensis
Rumpi mouse shrew, M. rumpii
Schaller's mouse shrew, M. schalleri
Sclater's mouse shrew, M. sclateri
Thin mouse shrew, M. tenuis
Forest shrew, M. varius
Kilimanjaro mouse shrew, M. zinki

References

 
Mammal genera
Taxa named by John Edward Gray
Taxonomy articles created by Polbot